Parvin Dabas (born 12 July 1974) is an Indian actor, director and model, who works predominantly in Hindi and English language films.

Early life
Parvin Dabas was born on 12 July 1974. His family is from Kanjhawala, Outer Delhi. He studied in Modern School Vasant Vihar, New Delhi and then in Hans Raj College, Delhi University.

Career
Dabas made his film debut in the 1999 film Dillagi and played a key role in the Malayalam film Ayyappantamma Neyyappam Chuttu along with Antara Mali the following year. His first major movie as actor was Monsoon Wedding directed by Mira Nair and he has since appeared in over 10 Bollywood films.
He did a film named Tumse Milkar with Reshmi Ghosh

He later starred in films such as The Hero: Love Story of a Spy, Maine Gandhi Ko Nahin Mara and Khosla Ka Ghosla for which he won acclaim. In 2005 he gave a guest appearance(as Sudhanshu) in Sarabhai vs Sarabhai TV serial aired on STAR One in one episode directed by Deven Bhojani.

He directed his first film Sahi Dhandhe Galat Bande (Right Businesses Wrong Guys) which released on 19 August 2011. He won a bronze palm award at the 2011 Mexico International Film Festival and a Silver Remi Award at the Worldfest Houston 2011 (Houston International Film Festival). The film was selected for the Indian Panorama section of the International Film Festival of India 2011, held in Goa from 23 November to 3 December.

Personal life
Dabas is also a trained scuba diver and underwater photographer. He married actress Preeti Jhangiani on 23 March 2008. They have a son Jaiveer on 11 April 2011. On 27 September 2016 they had their second child Dev. They live in Bandra with family.

Filmography

Television 
Hostages (2019 ) for Hotstar

Sarabhai Vs Sarabhai (Indian series) (2005) for Starone

Awards and nominations

References

External links
 
indiafm.com
 Parvin Dabas to star in Karan's film - Times of India

Indian male film actors
Delhi University alumni
Indian male models
Living people
1974 births